Henry Thomas Meyer (November 6, 1922 – March 12, 2019) was an American professional basketball player. He played in the National Basketball League for the Detroit Gems during the 1946–47 season and averaged 7.8 points per game.

References 

1922 births
2019 deaths
American men's basketball players
Basketball players from Michigan
Centers (basketball)
Detroit Gems players
People from Dearborn, Michigan
Professional Basketball League of America players